Zatara (Tara for short), is a female tabby cat living in California, United States, who rescued her human family's child from being attacked by a neighbor dog named Scrappy. The moment was recorded on household surveillance. The footage uploaded on YouTube received over 16.8 million views in the first 48 hours.

Early life
Tara joined the Triantafilo family in 2008 after she followed the parents to their home. The name Tara was the pet form of 'Zatara', the name smugglers gave to Edmond Dantès in The Count of Monte Cristo. The smugglers said it meant driftwood.

Rise to fame
On May 13, 2014, Jeremy Triantafilo, a four-year-old boy with autism, was riding his bicycle in his family's driveway in Bakersfield, California, when a neighborhood dog, described as an 8-month-old Labrador-Chow mix, came from behind and attacked his leg. The dog was pulling Jeremy down his driveway when Tara, who the family states was very attached to Jeremy, tackled the dog and chased him away, then returned to Jeremy's side to check on him. Jeremy needed 10 stitches in his left calf following the attack, but he quickly recovered and was thankful for Tara's actions, calling her "my hero".

A few days later, the local minor league baseball team the Bakersfield Blaze invited the cat, assisted by Jeremy's family, to throw the first pitch at a Bakersfield minor league baseball game in Sam Lynn Ballpark as a recognition for her deed. In the same spirit, Cat Fanciers' Association announced Tara as the recipient of its first-ever Cat Hero Award. 

On June 3, 2014, the Bakersfield Board of Supervisors proclaimed June 3 Tara the Hero Cat Day.

On August 15, 2014, Tara was awarded the Special Award For Cat Achievement by the Cat Vid Festival.

On September 26, 2014, Tara was awarded the Blue Tiger Award; an award only awarded to military service dogs.

Tara became the first non-human to be named the grand marshal for Bakersfield's Christmas parade in 2014.

On June 19, 2015, Tara was awarded with the Los Angeles SPCA's "Hero Dog" award, for which she also won a year's supply of cat food.

On New Year's Day, 2018, Tara and her family rode in the Rose Parade on the Lucy Pet Foundation Paws for Life float honoring heroic animals.

Fate of the dog
Scrappy, an approximately 8-month-old Labrador-Chow mix was surrendered by its owners to the City of Bakersfield Animal Care Center later on May 13, when it began a mandatory 10-day quarantine period to determine whether the animal had rabies.

After the video of Tara went viral, websites and online petitions popped up urging the dog not be put down, and calls flooded the phones at the Bakersfield Animal Care Center, according to its director Julie Johnson. Despite this, based on the observations in the kennel during the quarantine period, the dog remained classified as a "vicious" and "dangerous" animal. Therefore, adoption requests were strictly denied.

At the end of the mandatory 10-day quarantine period, Scrappy was euthanized despite opposition from animal groups and online petitioners. The dog "was humanely euthanized over the weekend," May 24, 2014, according to Johnson, who noted the incident has ended far from quietly.

See also
 List of individual cats
 Cats and the Internet

References

External links
 Tara Hero Cat - Official, Facebook page
 "My Cat Saved My Son", YouTube, May 15, 2014 (re-uploaded version of original without graphic image of wound)

2008 animal births
Individual cats in the United States